Nikola Radulović (born 25 February 1993) is a Serbian footballer who plays as an attacking midfielder or forward for Septemvri Simitli.

Career
Radulović began his football career for Radnički Pirot. He joined the CSKA Sofia Academy in January 2010 and signed his first professional contract with the club on 28 February 2011.

A two days later, CSKA agreed for Radulović to spend a three month loan spell at Akademik Sofia. He made his debut on 19 March at the Hadzhi Dimitar Stadium in a 0–3 defeat to Sliven 2000, coming on as a substitute for Ivan Redovski. Nikola scored his first competitive goal for Akademik in a 1–1 draw against Bdin on 17 September 2011.

Career statistics

References

External links

1993 births
Living people
Serbian footballers
Association football midfielders
PFC CSKA Sofia players
Akademik Sofia players
PFC Spartak Varna players
FC Septemvri Simitli players
First Professional Football League (Bulgaria) players
Serbian expatriate footballers
Expatriate footballers in Bulgaria